Beerepalli is a village in Anantapur district of the Indian state of Andhra Pradesh. It also serves as the headquarters of M. Beerepalli panchayat.

References

Villages in Anantapur district